Bico e Cristelo is a civil parish in the municipality of Paredes de Coura, Portugal. It was formed in 2013 by the merger of the former parishes Bico and Cristelo. The population in 2011 was 783, in an area of 11.68 km2.

References

Freguesias of Paredes de Coura